The Kashmir pygmy shrew  (Sorex planiceps) is a species of mammal in the family Soricidae. It is found in India and Pakistan.

References

Sorex
Fauna of Pakistan
Taxonomy articles created by Polbot
Mammals described in 1911